St. Cecilia Academy is a private, Roman Catholic, all-female high school in Nashville, Tennessee. Founded in 1860, it is located in the Roman Catholic Diocese of Nashville.

Athletics 
St. Cecilia Academy is a member of the Tennessee Secondary School Athletic Association and competes in the Division II-AA classification.

Accreditations and affiliations 
Accredited By: Southern Association of Independent Schools (SAIS) and Southern Association of Colleges and Schools (SACS).

References

External links 
St. Cecilia website

Educational institutions established in 1860

Roman Catholic Diocese of Nashville
Catholic secondary schools in Tennessee
Schools in Nashville, Tennessee
Girls' schools in Tennessee
1860 establishments in Tennessee